Muddy Fork is a tributary, about  long, of the Sandy River in the U.S. state of Oregon. Arising at the base of Sandy Glacier on the west slope of Mount Hood, it flows west through the Mount Hood Wilderness in the Mount Hood National Forest. The stream offers limited fishing for coastal cutthroat trout.

Course
Its entire course lies within the Mount Hood National Forest and Clackamas County.

Flowing generally west from the glacier, it passes south of McNeil Point, which is on the stream's right. It then flows between Yocum Ridge, which is to the left, and Bald Mountain to the right before being crossed by the Pacific Crest Trail near the eastern end of Old Maid Flat. The Sandy River enters Old Maid Flat to the left of Muddy Fork, and the two run roughly parallel across the flat until joining near Last Chance Mountain, which is on the right. The confluence is upstream of Fred McNeil Campground and Lolo Pass Road (Forest Road 18). Muddy Fork has no named tributaries.

Fishing
Although Muddy Fork is closed to salmon fishing, the stream has wild cutthroat trout "of fair size". The stream is open to catch and release fishing for cutthroat but only with artificial flies and lures. Conditions are generally best in spring before seasonal runoffs of glacial silt.

See also
List of rivers of Oregon

References

External links
Sandy River Basin Watershed Council

Rivers of Oregon
Mount Hood
Rivers of Clackamas County, Oregon
Mount Hood National Forest